Carl Gunne (29 September 1893 – 3 May 1979) was a Swedish painter. His work was part of the painting event in the art competition at the 1936 Summer Olympics.

References

1893 births
1979 deaths
20th-century Swedish painters
Swedish male painters
Olympic competitors in art competitions
People from Sundsvall
20th-century Swedish male artists